Gorka García Zubikarai (born 8 February 1975) is a Spanish retired footballer. On the left side of the pitch, he could operate as both a defender or a midfielder.

Football career
García was born in Antzuola, Gipuzkoa. In the 2003–04 season, he played ten matches in La Liga for CA Osasuna – four as a starter – as the Navarrese finished 13th, but spent the bulk of his professional career in the second division, appearing in 175 games in representation of four clubs and retiring well into his 30s.

García made his debut in the Spanish top level on 20 September 2003, coming on as a second-half substitute in a 1–1 away draw against FC Barcelona.

References

External links

1975 births
Living people
People from Debagoiena
Spanish footballers
Footballers from the Basque Country (autonomous community)
Association football defenders
Association football midfielders
La Liga players
Segunda División players
Segunda División B players
CD Laudio players
SD Eibar footballers
Levante UD footballers
Córdoba CF players
CA Osasuna players
Lorca Deportiva CF footballers
Cultural Leonesa footballers